The 1873–74 season was the first season of competitive football by Dumbarton.

Scottish Cup

Dumbarton became members of the fledgeling Scottish FA and contributed to the purchase of a challenge cup. In this inaugural Scottish Cup competition, the club reached the second round, following a walk-over against Vale of Leven in the first round with a 1–0 defeat against Renton in the second round replay, after a 0-0 draw.

Friendlies
During the season, reports were made of the playing of six 'friendly' matches, including home and away fixtures against local rivals Vale of Leven and Glasgow side, Callander. Of these matches, two were won, one drawn and three lost, scoring three goals and conceding nine.

Player statistics
Only includes appearances and goals in competitive Scottish Cup matches.

Source:

References

1873–74
Dumbarton